Giorgio Tavecchio (born July 16, 1990), nicknamed "Italian Ice", is a placekicker for the Barcelona Dragons of the European League of Football. He was born in Milan, Italy and was signed as an undrafted free agent by the San Francisco 49ers in 2012. He played his collegiate career at the University of California-Berkeley.

College career
Tavecchio's original plan was to attend UC Davis after they offered him a soccer scholarship. Because UC Davis was not also interested in him as a football placekicker, he considered  other options. He then set up a workout at Cal but was only offered to be a walk-on.

Tavecchio began attending Cal in 2008 and competed with David Seawright and Jordan Kay to be the team's placekicker. As a freshman, he split time with Seawright and converted all 25 extra point attempts and 9-of-13 field goal attempts. As a sophomore in 2009, he competed with Vincenzo D'Amato for the placekicking duties. With D'Amato handling a majority of the work, Tavecchio converted 14-of-15 extra point attempts and 8-of-12 field goal attempts. As a junior in 2010, he handled all of the placekicking duties and converted 37-of-39 extra point attempts and 11-of-16 field goal attempts. Throughout his first three seasons, he posted a 68% field goal percentage and was able to reach 75% after his senior year. In his final collegiate season in 2011, he continued to handle all placekicking duties and converted 36-of-42 extra point attempts and 20-of-23 field goal attempts. In his senior season, he had his best statistical kicking performance against Arizona State in a 47–38 victory. In the win over the Sun Devils, he converted all five extra point attempts and all four field goal attempts. His 20 field goals made in the 2011 season led the Pac-12 Conference. During his time at Cal, he was a four-year starter.

Collegiate statistics

Professional career

Pre-draft
Going into the draft, Tavecchio was not invited to the NFL Combine. During the California Golden Bears pro day, it began to rain before he was able to perform any drills. Tavecchio kept running his planned drills but was unable to showcase his talents since every NFL scout had gone into an indoor practice facility. Tavecchio remained unsigned after going undrafted in the 2012 NFL Draft. He then attended a tryout for the San Francisco 49ers at which he was the only kicker present.

San Francisco 49ers
On August 29, 2012, Tavecchio signed a three-year, $1.44 million contract with the San Francisco 49ers. At the time, 49ers special teams coach, Brad Seely was looking for an additional kicker to eventually succeed long-time veteran David Akers. The left-footed Tavecchio was chosen because Akers was also left-footed and they could both use the same holder, instead of getting another holder for a right-footed kicker.

Green Bay Packers
After being waived by the San Francisco 49ers during the offseason, the Green Bay Packers signed him to a three-year, $1.48 million contract on March 26, 2013.

Tavecchio was waived by the Packers on August 26, 2013.

Detroit Lions
The Detroit Lions signed Tavecchio to a reserve/futures contract on January 1, 2014. The Lions waived him on August 25, 2014.

Oakland Raiders
On August 27, 2014, the Oakland Raiders claimed Tavecchio off of waivers. Three days later, he was waived by the team.

On February 23, 2015, Tavecchio signed a contract to return to the Raiders. He was waived by the team on September 5, 2015.

On January 5, 2016, the Raiders signed Tavecchio to a two-year, $990,000 reserve/futures contract. On August 29, 2016, he was released by the Raiders.

On April 19, 2017, Tavecchio again signed with the Raiders. He was waived by team on September 2, 2017, and was later signed to the practice squad. He was promoted to the active roster on September 9, 2017, after longtime Raiders kicker Sebastian Janikowski was placed on the injured reserve list with a back injury.

Tavecchio played his first game on September 10, 2017, where he scored four field goals on four attempts, including two 52-yard attempts, and two extra points on two attempts, providing over half the scoring in a 26–16 victory over the Tennessee Titans. He became the first player to hit two 50-plus yard field goals on his debut in NFL history. Tavecchio's performance in Week 1 earned him AFC Special Teams Player of the Week. In the next game, a 45–20 victory over the New York Jets, he had a season-high six extra points converted to go along with a 29-yard field goal. Overall, he finished the 2017 season with 33-of-34 extra point attempts converted to go along with 16-of-21 field goals converted in all 16 games.

On August 3, 2018, Tavecchio was waived by the Raiders after the team signed veteran kicker Mike Nugent.

Atlanta Falcons
On August 27, 2018, Tavecchio was signed by the Atlanta Falcons. He was waived by the team on September 1, 2018. He was re-signed by the team on October 10, 2018, after incumbent kicker Matt Bryant injured his hamstring after kicking a 57-yard field goal the previous week. In Week 7, Tavecchio converted both extra point attempts and all three field goal tries, including a career long 56-yarder, in a 23–20 win over the New York Giants, earning him NFC Special Teams Player of the Week.

On August 31, 2019, he was waived by the Falcons after the team re-signed veteran kicker Matt Bryant.

Los Angeles Wildcats
Tavecchio signed with the Los Angeles Wildcats of the XFL on March 4, 2020. He had his contract terminated when the league suspended operations on April 10, 2020.

Tennessee Titans
On November 10, 2020, Tavecchio was signed to the Tennessee Titans practice squad. He was released on November 24.

Barcelona Dragons
On July 17, 2021, Tavecchio played his first match with the Barcelona Dragons (ELF) in the European League of Football. He converted one extra point attempt and three field goal attempts, including a 56-yarder.

References

External links

Cal Golden Bears bio

1990 births
Living people
Italian expatriate sportspeople in the United States
Italian players of American football
Sportspeople from Milan
American football placekickers
California Golden Bears football players
San Francisco 49ers players
Green Bay Packers players
Detroit Lions players
Oakland Raiders players
Atlanta Falcons players
Los Angeles Wildcats (XFL) players
Tennessee Titans players
Italian expatriate sportspeople in Spain
Expatriate players of American football
Players of American football from California
People from Moraga, California
Sportspeople from the San Francisco Bay Area
Barcelona Dragons (ELF) players